Suzanne Kaaren (March 21, 1912 – August 27, 2004) was an American B-movie actress and dancer who starred in stock film genres of the 1930s and 1940s: horror films, westerns, comedies, and romances.

Early life
A native of New York City, she was born Sophie Kischnerman on March 21, 1912 in Brooklyn, New York. Kaaren attended Erasmus Hall High School and Hunter College before being signed by 20th Century Fox in September 1933. In 1931, she won a high-jumping contest in a New York City school contest. Her parents refused to let her compete in the Olympic Games. She collected butterflies as a hobby and had several books filled with the insects.

Career

Early career
She acted with stock companies and posed as a model for commercial painters and cigarette advertising. Kaaren appeared in dramatic parts in New York theaters and trained at the Hedgerow Theatre in Philadelphia, Pennsylvania.

Early on, Kaaren was a Ziegfeld Girl and later was one of the original Rockettes. She performed on stage on December 27, 1932, the night Radio City Music Hall opened.

Movie actress

Kaaren left for Hollywood in October 1933. Her starting salary with Fox Films was $150 per week. She was eventually cast opposite Tim McCoy in Ridin' Gents, a Monogram Pictures production. She was then signed by Republic Pictures to play a character in From Rags To Riches. Ridin' Gents was filmed without either McCoy or Kaaren.

She joined a troupe assembled by producer Walter Wanger, which also included Gloria Youngblood. The theatrical company was known as Trade Winds. The comedy When's Your Birthday? (1937) showcased the zany Joe E. Brown, with Kaaren among the supporting players in an RKO Radio Pictures movie about an astrologer.

In October 1941, Kaaren was added to the cast of I Married an Angel. She portrayed a maid named Simone, and was uncredited. In October 1943, Pete Smith assigned Kaaren and Harry Barris the leading roles in an MGM motion picture which was to be called Practical Joker. The film was never made.

Kaaren figured prominently in several Three Stooges comedy short films. They are Disorder in the Court, Yes, We Have No Bonanza, and What's the Matador?.

Miracles for Sale (1939) was based on the novel Death From A Tophat by Clayton Rawson. Kaaren plays a woman who is separated into halves and then joined together again suspensefully. The murder mystery has Robert Young and Florence Rice in prominent roles.

She starred opposite Bela Lugosi in The Devil Bat. The cult film of the horror film genre is a Poverty Row production released by Producers Releasing Corporation. In the movie, Lugosi breeds giant bats to attack people.

Her final appearance on film was an uncredited role as the Duchess of Park Avenue (Manhattan) in 1984's The Cotton Club.

Theater
Kaaren stepped into the character usually played by Ann Thomas in a Broadway presentation of Chicken Every Sunday. Staged in September 1944, Thomas left the production to go to Hollywood. In July 1946, Kaaren's elder son, Brewster, was in the play with her as an eight-month-old. She was also joined by her husband, Sidney Blackmer, on stage at the Bucks County Playhouse in New Hope, Pennsylvania. In April 1953, the Blackmers starred in Glad Tidings in Atlantic City, New Jersey. A month later, the show moved to the Quarterback Theatre, also in Atlantic City.

In 1959, Kaaren appeared in The Royal Family at the Hinsdale Summer Theater in Chicago, Illinois. Linda Darnell starred; Karyn Kupcinet and Stuart Brent were also in the cast. The theme was a famous family of the American stage.

Personal life
Kaaren married stage and screen actor Sidney Blackmer on June 13, 1943, in a civil ceremony in Santa Ana, California. Raquel Torres was a witness at the wedding. Blackmer was married previously to Lenore Ulric.

By this time, Kaaren was under contract to Metro-Goldwyn-Mayer. The marriage was a turbulent one from the outset. The couple separated in September 1943 and Blackmer instructed his attorney to file for divorce in October, but the couple remained together until Blackmer's death in October 1973. The marriage produced two sons, Brewster and Jonathen.

The Blackmers had lived in his family home in Salisbury, North Carolina, until it was damaged by fire in 1984. Afterward, she resided in a rent-controlled Manhattan apartment at 100 Central Park South. According to her obituary, real estate developer (and later the 45th president of the United States) Donald Trump bought the building and threatened to evict all the tenants and tear it down to build something more lucrative. Kaaren's apartment was assessed at $750,000, but she refused to budge, and, in 1998, a court ruled that Trump could turn the apartments into condos, but had to allow the rent-controlled tenants to remain. She was, therefore, given $750,000 compensation.

Death
On August 27, 2004, Kaaren died from pneumonia at the Lillian Booth Actors Home in Englewood, New Jersey, aged 92.

References

Further reading
 Bismarck Tribune, "New Browning Mystery Stars Suzanne Kaaren", September 9, 1939, page 8.
 Fitchburg Sentinel, "News and Comment Of Stage and Screen", October 2, 1937, page 5.
 Long Beach Independent, "Sidney Blackmer To Sue For Divorce", October 26, 1943, page 2.
 New York Times, "Screen Notes", September 27, 1933, page 24.
 New York Times, "Girl Athlete Gets Movie Job", November 11, 1933, page 11.
 New York Times, "News Of The Screen", March 22, 1938, page 18.
 New York Times, "Screen News Here And In Hollywood", August 29, 1938, page 10.
 New York Times, "Screen News Here And In Hollywood", June 26, 1941, page 27.
 New York Times, "Screen News Here And In Hollywood", October 24, 1941, page 27.
 New York Times, "Sidney Blackmer Marries", August 9, 1943, page 10.
 New York Times, "Three Plays Delay Broadway Debuts", September 15, 1944, page 17.
 New York Times, "Vera Allen Named By Theatre Wing", July 4, 1946, page 23.
 New York Times, "Atlantic City Bills Listed", April 17, 1953, page 30.
 New York Times, "Early-Season Attractions In Jersey", May 3, 1953, page X17.
 Ogden Standard-Examiner, "Photo Collector", February 4, 1934, page 11.
 Olean Times-Evening Herald, "All Ready? Then Get Your Eyes Ready For A New Screen Beauty!", November 11, 1933, page 3.
 Suburbanite Economist, "Linda Darnell Plays Hinsdale", August 5, 1959, page 16.
 Syracuse Herald Journal. "In Step With:The Rockettes", December 27, 1992, page 182.
 Washington Post, "Astrology, Boxing Bouts Mix In Latest Joe E. Brown Picture", March 4, 1937, page 12.
 Washington Post, "Sidney Blackmer, Noted Actor, Dies", October 7, 1973, page B6.

External links

 
 
 

Actresses from New York (state)
American stage actresses
American film actresses
Female models from New York (state)
American female dancers
American dancers
Hunter College alumni
People from Brooklyn
Vaudeville performers
20th-century American actresses
1912 births
2004 deaths
The Rockettes
Erasmus Hall High School alumni
Dancers from New York (state)
20th-century American comedians
Ziegfeld girls